The 1966 Magyar Kupa (English: Hungarian Cup) was the 27th season of Hungary's annual knock-out cup football competition.

Final

Replay

See also
 1966 Nemzeti Bajnokság I

References

External links
 Official site 
 soccerway.com

1966–67 in Hungarian football
1966–67 domestic association football cups
1966